Lakshadweep Lok Sabha constituency is a Lok Sabha (lower house of the Indian parliament) constituency, which covers the entire area of the Union Territory of Lakshadweep in India. This seat is reserved for Scheduled Tribes. As of 2014, it is the smallest Lok Sabha constituency by number of voters.

Before its first election in 1967, its member of parliament (MP) was directly appointed by the President of India. Its first MP was K. Nalla Koya Thangal of the Indian National Congress (INC) who served two terms from 1957 to 1967. Its first election in 1967 was won by independent politician, P. M. Sayeed. In the next election in 1971, Sayeed representing the INC was elected unopposed. He went on to win the next eight elections consecutively before being defeated by 71 votes in the 2004 election by P. Pookunhi Koya of the  Samata party election campaign led by Jayakumar Ezhuthupally from samata party Kerala party. In total, Sayeed represented this constituency in the Lok Sabha for ten consecutive terms from 1967 to 2004. In the 2009 election, Sayeed's son, Muhammed Hamdulla Sayeed, won the seat. After 2019 General elections, Mohammed Faizal P. P. of the Nationalist Congress Party was the MP till his disqualification. He was disqualified after he was convicted with 10 year jail term.

Members of Parliament

Election results

General election 1967
Independent candidate, P. M. Sayeed won the first election and represented this constituency in the 4th Lok Sabha. Sayeed was also the youngest MP elected to the 4th Lok Sabha.

General election 1971
In the 1971 election, INC candidate, P. M. Sayeed was elected unopposed.

General election 1977
P. M. Sayeed held the seat and represented the constituency in the 6th Lok Sabha.

General election 1980
P. M. Sayeed defected to the Indian National Congress (Urs) party but still held the seat and represented the constituency in the 7th Lok Sabha.

General election 1984
P. M. Sayeed returned to the INC and held the seat and represented the constituency in the 8th Lok Sabha.

General election 1989
P. M. Sayeed held the seat and represented the constituency in the 9th Lok Sabha.

General election 1991
P. M. Sayeed held the seat and represented the constituency in the 10th Lok Sabha.

General election 1996
P. M. Sayeed held the seat and represented the constituency in the 11th Lok Sabha.

General election 1998
P. M. Sayeed held the seat and represented the constituency in the 12th Lok Sabha.

General election 1999
P. M. Sayeed held the seat and represented the constituency in the 13th Lok Sabha.

General election 2004
P. Pookunhi Koya of the JD (U) party (part of the BJP-led NDA) defeated the ten term incumbent MP, P. M. Sayeed by 71 votes.

General election 2009
Muhammed Hamdulla Sayeed won the seat and also became the youngest member of the 15th Lok Sabha.

General election 2014
Mohammed Faizal P. P. of the Nationalist Congress Party won the seat and represented the constituency in the 16th Lok Sabha.

General election 2019

See also
 Malkajgiri Lok Sabha constituency
 Ladakh Lok Sabha constituency
 List of Constituencies of the Lok Sabha
 Government of India

Notes

References 
 Lakshadweep Lok Sabha Election 2019 Result Website

External links
Lakshadweep lok sabha constituency election 2019 date and schedule

Lakshadweep
Constituencies of the Lok Sabha
Lok Sabha
Elections in Lakshadweep
1957 establishments in Lakshadweep